Paul Peters may refer to:
Paul Peters (publisher) (born 1982), American publisher
Paul Douglas Peters, person convicted after 2011 Australian bomb hoax
Paul Evan Peters (1947–1996), American librarian